Muhammet Kızılarslan (born July 23, 1986) is an Olympic skier competing in the cross-country discipline.

Born 1986 in Sungurlu, a town in the province of Çorum Province, Turkey, Kızılarslan started skiing in Ankara, where he lives now. He entered the Turkish national ski team in 2003. Thanks to the 108.18 FIS points he received at the Race of Alps Nations held 2005 in Schilpario, he qualified for direct participation at 2006 Winter Olympics in Italy.

He represented Turkey  at the 2006 Winter Olympic Games in Turin, Italy along with his teammate Sebahattin Oglago.

Achievements
 2005
 World Ski Championships, Oberstdorf, Germany
 Sprint: (73rd)
 15 km: (90th)
 Organisation of Alps Nations, Schilpario, Italy 	 	
 Sprint: (92nd)
 10 km: (74th)
 World Junior Championships, Rovaniemi, Finland
 Sprint: (70th)
 10 km: (64th)
 Organisation of Alps Nations, Campra, Switzerland
 10 km Juniors: (3rd)
 10 km: (54th)
 15 km: (72nd) 
 World Junior Championships, Kranj, Slovenia
 Sprint: (31st)
 10 km: (66th)
 2006
 Winter Olympics, Torino, Italy
 15 km Classical: 45:06.8 (75th)
 Team sprint (Semifinal 1): 19:46.5 (12th)

References
 Turkey National Olympic Committee official website
 

1986 births
Turkish male cross-country skiers
Olympic cross-country skiers of Turkey
Cross-country skiers at the 2006 Winter Olympics
Living people
21st-century Turkish people